The Slim Princess is a 1920 American silent comedy film starring Mabel Normand, directed by Victor Schertzinger, produced by Samuel Goldwyn, and written by Gerald C. Duffy based on a musical play of the same name by Henry Blossom and Leslie Stuart, which was from a story by George Ade. The picture is a Goldwyn Pictures Corporation production with a supporting cast featuring Hugh Thompson, Tully Marshall, Russ Powell, Lillian Sylvester, and Harry Lorraine.

The cinematographer was George Webber and future director Henry Hathaway was a 22-year-old prop boy on the set.

Plot
As described in a film magazine, Princess Kalora (Normand) of Morovenia, a fictional country where obese women are prized and the normal-sized princess is widely regarded as being too slender, finds no suitors in the matrimonial market. Her younger sister, weighing in the neighborhood of 300 pounds and who is also the family favorite, is sought by the eligible men of the court. American millionaire Alexander Pike (Thompson) sees the princess and immediately falls in love with her, and is then hounded from the country by the police of her father. The princess is later sent to America to partake of a patent fat producer that is widely advertised, and meets Alexander at the Ambassador's ball. Their romance is interrupted when a cable calls the princess and her bodyguard back to Morovenia. Arriving at home thinner than when she left, Kalora is thrown into a dungeon. When Alexander, whose millions are no less powerful in Morovenia than in America, arrives, he convinces her father of his love for Kalora, marries the princess, thus opening the way to the altar for the second daughter, and all are happy.

Cast
Mabel Normand as Princess Kalora
Hugh Thompson as Alexander Pike
Tully Marshall as Papova
Russ Powell as Governor General
Lillian Sylvester as Jeneka
Harry Lorraine as Detective
Pomeroy Cannon as Counsellor

Original version
The film is a remake of a 1915 movie featuring Francis X. Bushman, Ruth Stonehouse, and Wallace Beery.

Preservation
It is not known whether the film currently survives, which suggests that it is a lost film.

References

External links

 The Slim Princess at Looking for Mabel Normand

1920 films
American silent feature films
Silent American comedy-drama films
American black-and-white films
Films directed by Victor Schertzinger
Films based on American novels
Goldwyn Pictures films
1920 comedy-drama films
Films with screenplays by Gerald Duffy
1920s American films